The virgate, yardland, or yard of land ( []) was an English unit of land. Primarily a measure of tax assessment rather than area, the virgate was usually (but not always) reckoned as  hide and notionally (but seldom exactly) equal to 30 acres. It was equivalent to two of the Danelaw's oxgangs.


Name
The name derives from the Old English  ("yard of land"), from "yard"'s former meaning as a measuring stick employed in reckoning acres (cf. rod). The word is etymologically unrelated to the yard of land around a dwelling. "Virgate" is a much later retronym, anglicizing the yardland's latinized form virgāta after the advent of the yard rendered the original name ambiguous.

History
The virgate was reckoned as the amount of land that a team of two oxen could plough in a single annual season. It was equivalent to a quarter of a hide, so was nominally thirty acres. In some parts of England, it was divided into four nooks.  Nooks were occasionally further divided into a farundel ("fourth deal, fourth share").

The Danelaw equivalent of a virgate was two oxgangs or ‘bovates’. These were considered to represent the amount of land that could be worked in a single annual season by a single ox and therefore equated to half a virgate. As such, the oxgang represented a parallel division of the carucate.

References

Units of area
Obsolete units of measurement